Freeze Frame were an English new wave band from Liverpool, England, which consisted of vocalist Steve Byrne, instrumentalist/producer Ronnie Stone and later, keyboardist Clive Gee. They released six singles between 1981 and 1985.

History
Steve Byrne and Ronnie Stone first met around 1980/81, while Byrne was singer in a punk/new wave band called The Posers. Stone was a member of 1970s duo Next, with Philip Franz Jones who would later become a member of Afraid of Mice.

The band's name Freeze Frame was named after the album by Godley & Creme. Before Freeze Frame, the band was known as In a Glass Darkly, doing gigs alongside China Crisis.

Clive Gee from Afraid of Mice joined Freeze Frame around the release of the single "Foxhole", which was their only charting single at No. 105.

The band did Radio One sessions for John Peel in 1983 and 1984. A new version of "Touch" was released in 1985, renamed "Touch (Re-Touch)".

Discography

Singles
1981: "Touch"
1983: "Your Voice"
1984: "Foxhole" - UK No. 105
1984: "Seeking Professional Advice"
1985: "Today/Tomorrow"
1985: "Touch (Re-Touch)"

Compilation appearances
1982: Cracking Up at the Pyramid ("Touch")
1984: Small Hits and Near Misses: The Inevitable Compilation ("Culture Won't Wait")
1990: The Invaders: The Inevitable Sampler Volume 2 ("Someone")

References

External links

English new wave musical groups
British synth-pop new wave groups
Musical groups from Liverpool
Musical groups established in 1981
Musical groups disestablished in 1985
English synth-pop groups